Cader is a village in Denbighshire, Wales.

Villages in Denbighshire